Louisa Rachel Solomon is the lead singer of The Shondes, an indie punk band from Brooklyn, NY. Solomon is known for being a Jewish musician who is outspoken about opposing the occupation of Palestine. She is best known for her emotional live performance, and has been called "a front-woman to fear and fall in love with."

History
As a teenager in the mid-late '90s, Solomon played in a riot grrrl punk band called Lucky Tiger, who released several cassettes and one 7" record and performed at Riot Grrrl conventions in New York City and Philadelphia in 1996. She also co-founded Pass the Buck Records with her sister Nicole Witte Solomon in 1995, a DIY Cassette label. In 1999, she formed The Syndicate with Jennie Jeddry, Emily Kramer, and Elijah Oberman (also of The Shondes) and released two albums, The Official Story and Haunted Ground.

Critical response

Peter Ames Carlin said The Garden features "better-stand-back vocals from Louisa Solomon, who has one of the biggest voices in pop music."
Depth of Field Magazine said "Lead singer Louisa Solomon’s voice is nothing short of breathtaking, caressing the notes while sending them forth with a power and force that forms immediate bonds with an audience; her tone and intonation giving the impression that she’s speaking directly to each and every individual listener."
"Lead singer Louisa Solomon steps out of the role of the one who has been wronged, and back into that of the unrepentant sinner, which suits her better. She’s her old self again, on the loose and in top form in her performance as a punk rock femme fatale. Not the ersatz Suicide Girls kind of femme fatale either, she’s the real kind that most people couldn’t possibly hope to handle. She creates the feeling that the stage is the safest place for her — and for all concerned. At any given moment she might be giving off a little Dolly Parton or Joan Jett vibe, but underneath it, and at all times, her own voice and personality are both growing so dominant and distinct that they seem to have their own gravitational pull."—MTV Iggy
"lead vocalist and bass player Louisa Solomon anchors and drives the band with a fury and finesse few frontwomen have these days."—Three Imaginary Girls
"Singer and bass player Louisa Solomon is the terrifying and alluring siren in this mess of nautical metaphors and similes I'm making, especially when belting lines like 'I never knew you could be so cowardly/ Now I'm always stuck in fucking Miami.' She mixes the cold fire of Rainer Maria's Caithlin de Marrais with the hearty women's music warmth of Tracy Chapman or Indigo Girls."—Stomp and Stammer
...no one in the band treated their instrument gently this past Saturday night on one of the last stops of a tour that started in August. All four members of the Shondes treated their Yiddish and classical–influenced post-punk like a heavy object to be lifted and carried. This was especially true of bassist and lead vocalist Louisa Rachel Solomon, who charged at the mic as if to push the song forward with her body.—Venus Zine
Louisa Rachel Solomon’s voice is a char-broiled mix of Patti Smith and new wave, with a frosty injection of Amy Lee for good measure.—Amplifier Magazine
Louisa Rachel Solomon's vocals are strong, nimble and graceful on the band's self-released debut, which sees both complex song structures intertwined with direct, inquisitive lyrics. --CMJ
On the band's debut album, The Red Sea, they sing political songs about New York City and their home borough of Brooklyn, as well as about high expectations for love and life. Fans of Sleater-Kinney will swoon over the Shondes, especially with vocalist Louisa Rachel Solomon's Corin Tucker–like croons about socially conscious living.—AfterEllen
“Don’t Look Down,” the first track, opens with a rock swagger worthy of Television and a gritty guitar. Louisa Rachel Solomon’s vocals are a bit to digest at first, but as the first key change hits and the power chords enter, her vocals push the songs to their conclusion and establish Solomon as the album’s focal point. As the songs progress, Solomon throws herself into the lyrics like waves against a wall, her voice quivering at the end of each word, choking the last shreds of meaning from every syllable she utters. And right as she sounds like she’s about to break, the band reinvents the song, drops the riff and ups the violin, a move that renews Solomon’s vigor and re-engages the hooks.—Performer Magazine
Minneapolis City Pages writer Ray Cummings' controversial comment "You probably wouldn't want frontwoman Louisa Soloman [sic] to go down on you in a theater", referencing the lyrics to "You Oughta Know" by Alanis Morissette, was met with immediate criticism

Personal life 
Solomon self-identifies as queer.

Notes and references

Living people
American women singers
Jewish American musicians
Jewish anti-Zionism in the United States
Musicians from Brooklyn
Year of birth missing (living people)
Jews in punk rock
21st-century American Jews
21st-century American women
Queer women
Women punk rock singers